Jefferson Avenue Footbridge is a historic footbridge located in Springfield, Missouri, United States.

It was added to the National Register of Historic Places in 2003.

As the footbridge approached its 100th anniversary, it became apparent that a major rehabilitation was required to preserve the aging structure. Springfield City officials partnered with the city's Commercial Club to obtain federal transportation enhancement grants and Community Development Block Grant funding to save the historic footbridge.

In addition to the extensive rehabilitation work on the footbridge, a gathering place plaza was created adjacent to the Commercial Street terminus.  The rehabilitation work was conducted between 2001 and 2002 at a cost of over $518,000. Nearly 100 years after the original footbridge was constructed, the rehabilitated structure was reopened to pedestrian traffic and rededicated on April 17, 2002.

The bridge was closed on March 1, 2016. It remains closed while the Springfield City Council decides its fate. Rehabilitation is an option, but the future of the bridge is no longer certain.

References

External links
bridgehunter.com

Pedestrian bridges on the National Register of Historic Places
Pedestrian bridges in Missouri
Bridges on the National Register of Historic Places in Missouri
Bridges completed in 1902
Transportation in Springfield, Missouri
Buildings and structures in Springfield, Missouri
National Register of Historic Places in Greene County, Missouri
Cantilever bridges in the United States